The Son is a 2002 Belgian-French mystery film directed by Jean-Pierre and Luc Dardenne.

Plot
Olivier, a carpenter by trade who teaches at a trades training center, knowingly takes on Francis Thorion, the murderer of his son, as an apprentice. Francis is unaware of his connection with Olivier from five years ago. Olivier, tormented by the loss of his son and his separation from his wife, develops a slight obsession with Francis. He stalks him home, steals his keys and explores his apartment, whilst slowly discovering more about the boy. Francis looks up to Olivier, seeing him as a surrogate role-model. With this on his mind, Olivier is ultimately torn between hatred for the murderer of his son and the moral ambiguity of accepting this child from a broken home and disillusioned past.

Cast
 Olivier Gourmet as Olivier
 Morgan Marinne as Francis Thorion
 Isabella Soupart as Magali
 Nassim Hassaïni as Omar
 Kevin Leroy as Raoul
 Félicien Pitsaer as Steve
 Rémy Renaud as Philippo
 Annette Closset as Training center director
 Fabian Marnette as Rino
 Jimmy Deloof as Dany
 Anne Gerard as Dany's mother

Interpretation
Luc Dardenne wrote a comment about The Son in his book Au dos de nos images. Magali, the ex-wife of Olivier is very astonished that Olivier took Francis, the murderer of their son, into his workshop . She says to Olivier, "Nobody would do that." He answers, "I know." And she replies, "Then, why do you do it?" He answers, "I don't know." And Luc Dardenne wrote "We don't know either."

Critical response
The Son received mostly positive reviews from film critics. Review aggregation website Rotten Tomatoes gives it an 88% approval rating, based on 57 reviews, with an average score of 7.7/10. The site's consensus reads, "Austere, finely crafted, and compelling.". At Metacritic, which assigns a normalized rating out of 100 to reviews from mainstream critics, the film received an average score of 86, based on 18 reviews, indicating "universal acclaim".

Awards and nominations
Olivier Gourmet received the Best Actor Award at the 2002 Cannes Film Festival for his portrayal of the tormented Olivier.

The film received the André Cavens Award for Best Film by the Belgian Film Critics Association (UCC). Roger Ebert ranked the film No. 7 on his list of the best films of the decade (2000–2009). Paste Magazine named it one of the 50 Best Movies of the Decade (2000–2009), ranking it at No. 8.

See also
 List of Belgian submissions for Academy Award for Best Foreign Language Film

References

External links
 
 
 

2002 films
2002 drama films
Belgian drama films
French drama films
2000s French-language films
Films directed by the Dardenne brothers
Belgium in fiction
Films set in Belgium
Films shot in Belgium
Walloon culture
Best French-Language Film Lumières Award winners
French-language Belgian films
2000s French films